Luc Landry Tabi Manga (born 20 March 1994) is a Cameroonian professional footballer who plays as a defender for Finnish premier division club Ilves.

References 

1994 births
Footballers from Yaoundé
Living people
Cameroonian footballers
Association football defenders
APEJES Academy players
FCI Levadia Tallinn players
Kuopion Palloseura players
SC Kuopio Futis-98 players
FC Ilves players
Meistriliiga players
Esiliiga players
Veikkausliiga players
Kakkonen players
Cameroonian expatriate footballers
Expatriate footballers in Estonia
Cameroonian expatriate sportspeople in Estonia
Expatriate footballers in Finland
Cameroonian expatriate sportspeople in Finland